The Food Industry Centre (FIC) at Cardiff Metropolitan University (also known as UWIC) is a Welsh research and education organisation designed to address issues of food safety and food-related health concerns. Its mission also includes supporting the Welsh food industry. The centre, which is part of UWIC's Cardiff School of Health Sciences at the university's Llandaff campus, was launched in 1999. A new facility for the centre opened on 21 April 2009 and was built at a cost of £5,000,000.

References

External links
Food Industry Centre web site

Cardiff Metropolitan University
Research institutes in Wales
Food science institutes